The Diving competition in the 1979 Summer Universiade were held in Mexico City, Mexico.

Medal overview

Medal table

References
 

1979 Summer Universiade
1979
1979 in diving